Nikki Harvey is an English Ten-pin bowler, from Southampton.

Nikki won the 2003 World Tenpin Masters defeating Andrew Frawley from Australia at the Goresbrook Leisure Centre in Dagenham.

References

British ten-pin bowling players
Year of birth missing (living people)
Living people
Sportspeople from Southampton